In differential geometry, Fenchel's theorem is an inequality on the total absolute curvature of a closed smooth space curve, stating that it is always at least . Equivalently, the average curvature is at least , where  is the length of the curve. The only curves of this type whose total absolute curvature equals  and whose average curvature equals  are the plane convex curves. The theorem is named after Werner Fenchel, who published it in 1929.

Proof
Given a closed smooth curve  with unit speed, the velocity  is also a closed smooth curve. The total absolute curvature is its length .

The curve  does not lie in an open hemisphere. If so, then there is  such that , so , a contradiction. This also shows that if  lies in a closed hemisphere, then , so  is a plane curve.

Consider a point  such that curves  and  have the same length. By the previous paragraph, at least one of the two curves  and  intersects with the equator at some point . Then .

So , and if equality holds then  does not cross the equator.

Therefore, and if equality holds then  lies in a closed hemisphere, and thus  is a plane curve.

References

; see especially equation 13, page 49

Theorems in differential geometry
Theorems in plane geometry
Theorems about curves
Curvature (mathematics)